The 2012 New Zealand Grand Prix event for open wheel racing cars was held at Manfeild Autocourse near Feilding on 12 February 2012. It was the fifty-seventh New Zealand Grand Prix and was open to Toyota Racing Series cars. The event was also the third race of the fifth round of the 2012 Toyota Racing Series, the final race of the series.

Twenty Tatuus-Toyota cars started the race which was won by 17-year-old New Zealander Nick Cassidy who became the who became the second teenager in as many years to claim the Grand Prix after sixteen-year-old Mitch Evans the previous year.

The Giles Motorsport team dominated the race, filling all three podium positions. Dutch driver Hannes van Asseldonk finished second, 05 seconds behind Cassidy. Third was Austrian driver Lucas Auer. Cassidy inherited the lead after the retirement of fellow Giles Motorsport driver and defending champion Mitch Evans who held a three-second lead when his car failed on lap 28. Completing Giles Motorsport's dominance of the race, Brazilian driver Bruno Bonifacio finished fourth. Nathanaël Berthon was the first driver from any other team, finishing fifth for M2 Competition.

Cassidy's win also wrapped up a success championship campaign for Cassidy, winning his first major championship with the 2012 Toyota Racing Series crown.

Results

Qualifying

Race

References

External links
 Toyota Racing Series

Grand Prix
New Zealand Grand Prix
Toyota Racing Series
February 2012 sports events in New Zealand